The Brumby Aircruiser is a four-seat general aviation aircraft currently under development by Brumby Aircraft Australia. The design has its origins in the 1960s Victa Aircruiser, itself a development of the successful Victa Airtourer.

Design and development
A single example was completed in 1966, before the company ceased aircraft production in 1967 when the government declined tariff protection. The design was later developed into the PAC CT/4. The type certificate was sold to Brumby in 2013. As of 2015, the status of the modernised aircraft is described by the company as in the "final design" stage. It will be marketed as a both a touring and business aeroplane. Under a recent deal with China's AVIC, engineers will travel to Brumby's Cowra, New South Wales plant to assist with production of the Aircruiser. The deal has shifted much of the production of Brumby's existing models to a larger facility in China, allowing the Cowra factory to concentrate on the Aircruiser project.

Variants
Brumby intends to offer three variants. A  Continental IO-360 powered version will be aimed at pilot training or as a replacement for the aging Cessna 172 and Piper Archer. A more powerful  Continental IO-550 will be offered to compete with the Cirrus SR22. A third option will be powered by a derated Rolls-Royce M250 turbine driving a three-bladed propeller, producing . Brumby will market this version specifically as a business aircraft, with no established competitor. The Aircruiser design already meets the requirements of the United States Federal Aviation Administration FAR 23 equivalent certification.

References

2010s Australian civil utility aircraft
Brumby Aircraft Australia aircraft